Juan Quintero Muñoz (1903–1980) was a Spanish film score composer. At six he started taking lessons in music theory and piano with a private teacher. At nine years old, his family moved to Madrid, where he continued his musical training.

Film Score works
 House of Cards (1943)
 Traces of Light (1943)
 White Mission (1946)
 Madness for Love (1948)
 Mare Nostrum (1948)
 Currito of the Cross (1949)
 The Duchess of Benameji (1949)
 Woman to Woman (1950)
 The Lioness of Castille (1951)
 A Cuban in Spain (1951)
 Lola the Coalgirl (1952)
 Malvaloca (1954)
 An Andalusian Gentleman (1954)
 The Mayor of Zalamea (1954)
 Congress in Seville (1955)
 Melancholic Autumn (1958)
 The Violet Seller (1958)
 Love Madness
 Agustina de Aragón
 Alba de America 
 Pequeñeces
 Her, He and His millions
 Heloise beneath an almond tree
 Currito Cross
 Sister San Sulpicio

Spanish film score composers
Male film score composers
1903 births
1980 deaths
20th-century composers
20th-century Spanish musicians
20th-century Spanish male musicians